Phrissogonus is a monotypic moth genus in the family Geometridae erected by Arthur Gardiner Butler in 1882. Its only species, Phrissogonus laticostata, the apple looper, was first described by Francis Walker in 1862. It is found in Australia, New Caledonia and New Zealand.

The wingspan is about 15 mm.

The larvae feed on Helianthus annuus, Hypericum perforatum, Clematis aristata and Acacia species.

References

External links
"Apple Looper (Phrissogonus laticostatus)". iNaturalist. Citizen science observations.

Geometridae genera
Eupitheciini
Moths of Australia
Moths described in 1862
Moths of New Zealand
Monotypic moth genera